Nikola Dagorov (3 June 1925 – c. 1 July 2019) was a Bulgarian triple jumper who competed in the 1952 Summer Olympics. He died in 2019 at the age of 94.

References

1925 births
2019 deaths
Bulgarian male triple jumpers
Olympic athletes of Bulgaria
Athletes (track and field) at the 1952 Summer Olympics